Marc Van Hulle from the KU Leuven, Belgium was named Fellow of the Institute of Electrical and Electronics Engineers (IEEE) in 2014 for contributions to biomedical signal processing and biological modeling.

References

Fellow Members of the IEEE
Living people
Year of birth missing (living people)
Place of birth missing (living people)
Academic staff of KU Leuven